Ramban can refer to:

 Nachmanides (1194 – ), Catalan rabbi and philosopher also known as RaMBaN
 Cave of the Ramban in Jerusalem
 Ramban, Jammu and Kashmir, a town in India
 Ramban district, an administrative unit in India
 Ramban (Vidhan Sabha constituency)
 Ramban Synagogue in Jerusalem
 Ranban, a village in Nepal

See also 
 Maimonides (1135/38 - 1204), Sephardic Jewish philosopher also known as Rambam